Golden Fleece Historical Adventure was an American adventure pulp magazine which published nine issues between 1938 and 1939.  Golden Fleece specialised in publishing historical fiction. It published two stories by Robert E. Howard, the creator of Conan the Barbarian: "Black Vulmea's Vengeance" and "Gates of Empire".  Other writers included Talbot Mundy, H. Bedford-Jones, Ralph Milne Farley, Anthony M. Rud and Murray Leinster.  Contributing artists included Jay Jackson, Harold Delay, Harold McCauley, and Margaret Brundage, who painted two covers for Golden Fleece.

Science fiction historian Mike Ashley describes it as a "rousing and unpretentious" magazine, and suggests that it may have failed because of distribution problems; the publisher, Sun Publications, was a small Chicago-based firm.  Ashley also suggests that it would have been difficult for the magazine to compete with Adventure, one of the leading pulp magazines of its day.

Bibliographic details 
The publisher was Sun Publications of Chicago; the editors were A. J. Gontier, Jr., and C.G. Williams.  There were nine monthly issues, from October 1938 to June 1939.  There was one volume of three issues, and a second volume of six issues.  Each magazine was in pulp format, with 128 pages, priced at 20 cents.

References

Sources 

 

 

Magazines established in 1938
Magazines disestablished in 1939
Magazines published in Chicago
Pulp magazines